Imarjoe Miller (born March 19, 1979) is an American professional boxer. Miller, a late-comer to the sport, went from juvenile delinquency to becoming a pro boxer. He is currently trained by Troy Bodean (boxing) at the wildcard boxing gym Roach.

Early life
Born in the Watts of Los Angeles, Miller's challenging life experiences have proven conducive to finding a career in the boxing ring–  He is a good counter puncher.
On August 9, 2002, he married Carletta Perkins also from Watts of Los Angeles

Amateur record
 One amateur fight at Villegas Park.

Professional career
He made his professional boxing debut scheduled on September 29, 2011, at the Hollywood park casino in Los Angeles, winning by unanimous decision.

Professional boxing record

Notes

References
 http://boxrec.com/list_bouts.php?human_id=584748&cat=boxer
 http://www.google.com/m?hl=en&gl=us&client=ms-android-att-us&source=android-launcher-widget&q=imarjoe+miller

Boxers from California
Living people
1979 births
Light-welterweight boxers
American male boxers